Marcetia is a genus of flowering plants belonging to the family Melastomataceae.

Its native range is Southern Tropical America. It is found in Brazil, Colombia, Guyana and Venezuela.

The genus name of Marcetia is in honour of François Marcet (1803–1883), a Swiss doctor, physiologist, inventor, and professor of physics. 
It was first described and published in Prodr. Vol.3 on page 124 in 1828.

Species
According to Kew:

Marcetia acerosa 
Marcetia alba 
Marcetia bahiana 
Marcetia bahiensis 
Marcetia bracteolaris 
Marcetia candolleana 
Marcetia canescens 
Marcetia cardosoana 
Marcetia eimeariana 
Marcetia ericoides 
Marcetia formosa 
Marcetia grandiflora 
Marcetia harleyi 
Marcetia hatschbachii 
Marcetia lanuginosa 
Marcetia latifolia 
Marcetia luetzelburgii 
Marcetia lychnophoroides 
Marcetia macrophylla 
Marcetia mucugensis 
Marcetia nervulosa 
Marcetia nummularia 
Marcetia oxycoccoides 
Marcetia paganuccii 
Marcetia semiriana 
Marcetia shepherdii 
Marcetia sincorensis 
Marcetia taxifolia 
Marcetia velutina 
Marcetia viscida

References

Melastomataceae
Melastomataceae genera
Plants described in 1828
Flora of Bolivia
Flora of northern South America
Flora of Brazil